The 2021–22 Longwood Lancers women's basketball team represented Longwood University in the 2021–22 NCAA Division I women's basketball season. The Lancers, led by fourth-year head coach Rebecca Tillet, played their home games at Willett Hall in Farmville, Virginia as members of the Big South Conference. 

They finished the season 22–12, 15–3 in Big South play to finish as co-Big South regular season champions. As the second seed in the Big South tournament, they defeated Hampton, UNC Asheville, and Campbell to win the  championship. As a result, the Lancers received the conference's automatic bid to the NCAA tournament, the school's first-ever trip to the tournament. They were seeded as one of the sixteen seeds in the Bridgeport Region.  They played a First Four matchup with Mount St. Mary's, which they won to advance to the First Round.  There, they fell to first seed NC State to end their season.

Previous season
The Lancers finished the season 14–11, and 12–6 in Big South play to finish in third place.  As the third seed in the Big South tournament they defeated UNC Ashville before losing to Campbell in the Semifinals.  They received an invitation to the WBI, but withdrew due to the ongoing COVID-19 pandemic.

Roster

Schedule and results

Source:

|-
!colspan=6 style=| Non-conference regular season

|-
!colspan=6 style=| Big South regular season

|-
!colspan=6 style=| Big South tournament

|-
!colspan=6 style=| NCAA tournament

Rankings

The Coaches Poll did not release a Week 2 poll and the AP Poll did not release a poll after the NCAA Tournament.

References

Longwood Lancers women's basketball seasons
Longwood Lancers
Longwood Lancers women's basketball
Longwood Lancers women's basketball
Longwood